Armin Mujakic (born 7 March 1995) is an Austrian football player who plays as an attacking midfielder or a striker for FCM Traiskirchen.

A product of Rapid Wien's academy, he debuted with the first team at 20 and stayed with the club for a total of six years, from 2012 to 2018.

Following brief spells in Greece, Belgium and South Korea (in this last case, he became the first foreign player signed by Chungnam Asan FC since its foundation), in 2021 he returned to Austria to play with FCM Traiskirchen, which was competing in the local third-tier.

References

External links
 	

1995 births
Living people
Austrian footballers
Austria youth international footballers
Austrian expatriate footballers
SK Rapid Wien players
Atromitos F.C. players
Lommel S.K. players
Super League Greece players
Austrian Football Bundesliga players
Challenger Pro League players
Expatriate footballers in Greece
Expatriate footballers in Belgium
Association football midfielders
Footballers from Vienna
Austrian people of Bosnia and Herzegovina descent